Bridgeport is a former logging town on the coast of Mendocino County, California. Its post office was given the name Miller, as there was already a Bridgeport post office in California.

It was described in the early 20th century as having once been "a thriving mercantile and shipping 
place", with a harbor ultimately considered to be too dangerous for regular use.

The Miller post office was first established in 1873, discontinued in 1880, re-established in 1883, and finally moved to Elk in 1908.

Related locations

References

Former settlements in Mendocino County, California